Nieuw Sloten is a neighborhood of Amsterdam, Netherlands.

Nieuw Sloten was created in the 1990s because the Netherlands failed to become the host of the 1992 Summer Olympics, losing to Barcelona, an agreement was made with local farmers and construction would then begin, Nieuw Sloten would almost overwhelm the older counterpart Sloten, but thanks to local disagreement and defence of the village by the locals, the village was kept untouched along with a small part of the former polders in which the buildings of Nieuw-West currently stand on today.

Amsterdam Nieuw-West
Neighbourhoods of Amsterdam